Hendrick Goltzius, or Hendrik, (January or February 1558 – 1 January 1617) was a German-born Dutch printmaker, draftsman, and painter. He was the leading Dutch engraver of the early Baroque period, or Northern Mannerism, lauded for his sophisticated technique, technical mastership and "exuberance" of his compositions. According to A. Hyatt Mayor, Goltzius "was the last professional engraver who drew with the authority of a good painter and the last who invented many pictures for others to copy". In the middle of his life he also began to produce paintings.

Biography

Goltzius was born near Viersen in Bracht or Millebrecht, a village then in the Duchy of Julich, now in the municipality Brüggen in North Rhine-Westphalia. His family moved to Duisburg when he was 3 years old. After studying painting on glass for some years under his father, he learned engraving from the Dutch polymath Dirck Volckertszoon Coornhert, who then lived in Cleves. In 1577 he moved with Coornhert to Haarlem in the Dutch Republic, where he remained based for the rest of his life. In the same town, he was also employed by Philip Galle to engrave a set of prints of the history of Lucretia.

Goltzius had a malformed right hand from a fire when he was a baby (his drawing of it is below), which turned out to be especially well-suited to holding the burin; "by being forced to draw with the large muscles of his arm and shoulder, he mastered a commanding swing of line".

In the 1580s, Goltzius with his friends van Mander and the painter Cornelis van Haarlem, founded an art academy in Haarlem in emulation of those in France and Bologna, where the human figure could be studied from life and to provide a meeting-place for artists to discuss both practice and aesthetics.

At the age of 21 he married a widow eight or nine years his senior, whose money enabled him to establish an independent business at Haarlem; but his unpleasant relations with her so affected his health that he found it advisable in 1590 to make a tour through Germany to Italy, where he acquired an intense admiration for the works of Michelangelo. He returned to Haarlem in August 1591, considerably improved in health, and worked there until his death.

His portraits, though mostly miniatures, are masterpieces of their kind, both on account of their exquisite finish, and as fine studies of individual character. Of his larger heads, his life-size self-portrait is probably the most striking example.

Goltzius brought to an unprecedented level the use of the "swelling line", where the burin is manipulated to make lines thicker or thinner to create a tonal effect from a distance. He also was a pioneer of "dot and lozenge" technique, where dots are placed in the middle of lozenge shaped spaces created by cross-hatching to further refine tonal shading.

Hollstein credits 388 prints to him, with a further 574 by other printmakers after his designs.

In his command of the burin, Goltzius is said to rival Dürer. He made engravings of Bartholomeus Spranger's paintings, thus increasing the fame of the latter – and his own. Goltzius began painting at the age of forty-two; some of his paintings can be found in Vienna. He also executed a few chiaroscuro woodcuts. He was the stepfather of engraver Jacob Matham. He died, aged 58, in Haarlem.

Public collections
Most major print rooms will have a group of Goltzius's many engravings.
 Museum Boijmans Van Beuningen, Rotterdam
 Rijksmuseum Amsterdam
 Blanton Museum of Art, Austin
University of Michigan Museum of Art, Ann Arbor
The Metropolitan Museum of Art, New York City
Philadelphia Museum of Art
British Museum, London
Los Angeles County Museum of Art
Fine Arts Museums of San Francisco

Gallery

Notes

Citations

References

Further reading 
  (see index).

External links 

1558 births
1617 deaths
Dutch engravers
Dutch Golden Age painters
Dutch male painters
Dutch Mannerist painters
People from the Duchy of Cleves
Artists from Haarlem
Renaissance engravers
Emigrants from the Holy Roman Empire to the Dutch Republic
16th-century engravers
17th-century engravers